
This is a list of bridges documented by the Historic American Engineering Record in the U.S. state of Virginia.

Bridges

See also
List of tunnels documented by the Historic American Engineering Record in Virginia

References

External links

List
List
Virginia
Bridges, HAER
Bridges, HAER